Pitti Immagine is a collection of fashion industry events in  Italy.

Pitti Immagine Uomo
Pitti Uomo (in English, "Pitti Men"), is one of the world's most important platforms for men's clothing and accessory collections, and for launching new projects in men's fashion.  It's held twice yearly in Florence, at the Fortezza da Basso.

The first edition of Pitti Uomo was held in Florence in September 1972. The exhibition provided a platform for raising the profile of Italian designers and now has  achieved international stature as a leading fashion fair. Pitti Uomo is credited with making dandyism acceptable to a wider audience. The 88th edition of Pitti Uomo (Pitti 88) in June 2015 hosted 30,000 visitors in total. The Pitti Immagine Uomo 2015 Award went to Lardini, and the Pitti Immagine Career Award was awarded to Nino Cerruti. Pitti Immagine Uomo 89 was held 12–15 January 2016 with 1,219 exhibitors. Pitti Uomo 90 was held in Florence 14–17 June 2016.
Brands showed their Fall/Winter 2017 men's collections at Pitti Uomo 91 on  10–13 January 2017. Pitti Uomo 92 in June 2017 hosted 30,000 visitors and 1,220 brands in  an exhibition area of 60,000 sq. meters.
Carlo Rivetti, owner of the brand Stone Island, has been an adviser of Pitti Immagine.

Pitti Immagine Bimbo
Pitti Immagine Bimbo: fashion collections from 0–14 years ("bimbo" is Italian for "baby"). Among the most long-lived of Pitti Immagine fairs, with more than 70 editions. In Florence, at the Fortezza da Basso twice a year. Private sector operators.

Pitti Immagine Filati
Pitti Immagine Filati: knitting yarn collections ("filati" is Italian for "yarns"). In Florence, at the Fortezza da Basso, two editions per year. Private sector operators.

Taste
Taste showcases products related to culture and food research. It's held at the Stazione Leopolda in Florence, once per year. Open only to professionals; at certain times is also open to the public.

Moda Prima
Fashion collections for men, women and children for the large retail chains. In Milan, twice a year. Private sector operators.

Fragranze
Collections of artistic perfumes and essential oils for the body and for the home. Held at the Stazione Leopolda in Florence once a year. Private sector operators; at certain times also open to the public.

Super
Women's ready-to-wear and accessories collections, held in Milan twice per year. Private sector operators.
During the three days of SUPER 8 in September 2016, more than 5,100 buyers from nearly 50 countries saw   collections presented by 142 brands.
SUPER 9 was held 25–27 February 2017 at Porta Nuova Varesine, Piazza Lina Bo Bardi, Milano.

See also

Culture of Italy

References

External links
Tommy Ton Pitti Uomo Fall 2013 January 11, 2013 GQ
Tommy Ton Pitti Uomo Spring 2014 June 19, 2013  GQ

Fashion events in Italy